Edward Rathbun may refer to:

 Edward Walter Rathbun (1865–1940), business owner and politician in Ontario, Canada
 Edward Wilkes Rathbun (1842–1903), American-born entrepreneur and politician in Ontario, Canada